Swing Shift may refer to:
The shift between the day and night shifts.
Swing Shift (album), a 1997 jazz album by Rik Emmett
Swing Shift (film), a 1984 film by Jonathan Demme
Swing Shift, a stop motion short film by Mike Jittlov
"Swing Shift (Soixante Neuf)", a song by Nash the Slash on his album Children of the Night